The 2022 UMass Minutemen football team represented the University of Massachusetts Amherst in the 2022 NCAA Division I FBS football season. The Minutemen played their home games at Warren McGuirk Alumni Stadium in Hadley, Massachusetts, and competed as an FBS independent. They were led by sixth-year head coach Don Brown, his first season back coaching the program since the 2008 season.

Schedule
UMass will host five home games and travel to seven different away games for the 2022 season.

Awards and honors
Starting running back Ellis Merriweather was nominated to the Maxwell Award Preseason Watch List and the ShrineBowl1000 preseason List, as well as teammates Josh Wallace and Billy Wooden.

References

UMass
UMass Minutemen football seasons
UMass Minutemen